Alan Hodgson (27 October 1951 – 6 October 2016) was an English cricketer. He was a left-handed batsman and a right-arm fast-medium bowler who used to play for Northamptonshire.

Hodgson made his debut in 1970, and was part of the Northamptonshire team that won the 1976 Gillette Cup. In the same year, he won a county cap. He retired in 1979, but continued to play for the Old Northamptonians. In his autobiography, David Gower described Hodgson as a "big tall Geordie". He died suddenly on 6 October 2016. Speaking after the announcement of his death, Allan Lamb said of Hodgson that "He was a great man. When I first came to Northampton he was the guy that looked after me, helped me and settled me in."

References

External links
 

1951 births
2016 deaths
English cricketers
Northamptonshire cricketers
Sportspeople from Durham, England
Cricketers from County Durham